"Girl Can't Help It" is a song by the American rock band Journey, from their 1986 album Raised on Radio. The song was released as the third single from that album, following "Be Good to Yourself" and "Suzanne." Like the previous two singles, "Girl Can't Help It" was a Billboard Top 40 hit, entering the chart on September 20, 1986 and peaking at number 17.
It also became a Top 10 rock hit, peaking at number 9 on the Billboard Mainstream Rock chart.

"Girl Can't Help It" was written by Journey keyboardist Jonathan Cain, vocalist Steve Perry, and guitarist Neal Schon, at the time of the song's release the only three members remaining in the band.

References 

1986 singles
1980s ballads
Columbia Records singles
Journey (band) songs
Rock ballads
Songs written by Jonathan Cain
Songs written by Neal Schon
Songs written by Steve Perry